Harry Norman Michael Lind (February 22, 1940 — October 25, 2002) was an American football fullback who played in the National Football League. He played college football at Notre Dame.

Early life and high school
Lind was born and grew up in Chicago, Illinois and attended Calumet High School. As a senior, he was named All-City and the Chicago Sun-Times Player of the Year and rushed for a 62 yard touchdown to help Calumet win Chicago's prep title over Lindblom Technical High School.

College career
Lind was a member of the Notre Dame Fighting Irish for four seasons. As a junior Lind was the team's second-leading rusher with 450 yards and four touchdowns on 87 carries. He was named Notre Dame's team captain going into his senior year, although he missed most of the season due to injuries.

Professional career
Lind was selected in the fifth round of the 1962 NFL Draft by the San Francisco 49ers and by the San Diego Chargers in the 19th round of the 1962 AFL Draft. In his second year, Lind was the 49ers primary fullback, rushing for 256 yards and a team-high seven touchdowns while also catching 25 passes for 178 yards. Lind was traded to the Pittsburgh Steelers shortly before the start of the 1965 season. In his first season with the team, Lind rushed for 375 yards and one touchdown with 25 receptions for 236 yards and one touchdown. He was waived by the Steelers six games into the 1966 season.

Later life and death
After his football career, Lind worked several jobs, including a building trades company. He died of cancer on October 25, 2002.

References

1940 births
2002 deaths
Notre Dame Fighting Irish football players
San Francisco 49ers players
American football fullbacks
Players of American football from Chicago
Pittsburgh Steelers players
Robert Lindblom Math & Science Academy alumni